NPPA may refer to:

 National Pest Plant Accord, a 2001 agreement in New Zealand
 National Press Photographers Association, an American professional association
 National Professional Practice Assessment, an examination for Certified Human Resources Professionals
 NPPA (gene), which encodes atrial natriuretic peptide
 NPPA Journal, now Crime & Delinquency, an academic journal of criminology